Ostrinia quadripunctalis is a species of moth in the family Crambidae. It is found in Norway, Germany, the Czech Republic, Austria, Italy, Slovakia, Hungary, the Republic of Macedonia, Albania, Ukraine and Russia.

References

Moths described in 1775
Pyraustinae
Moths of Japan
Moths of Europe